Blow to the Heart is a 1982 Italian drama film directed by Gianni Amelio.  The film entered the competition at the 39th Venice Film Festival. Fausto Rossi won a Silver Ribbon and a David di Donatello as best new actor.
The film also won the Silver Ribbon for best script. It was described as a "masterful psychological study investigating two profoundly different characters".

Plot

Cast
 Jean-Louis Trintignant as Dario
 Fausto Rossi as Emilio
 Laura Morante as Giulia
 Sonia Gessner as Emilio's mother
 Vanni Corbellini as Sandro Ferrari
 Laura Nucci as Dario's mother
 Matteo Cerami as Matteo

See also
 List of Italian films of 1982

References

External links
 

1982 films
Italian drama films
1982 drama films
Films directed by Gianni Amelio
Films with screenplays by Vincenzo Cerami
1980s Italian-language films
1980s Italian films